Adamthwaite is an English toponymic surname. Notable people with this name include:

 John Adamthwaite (1810–1870), English cricketer
 Michael Adamthwaite (born 1981), Canadian actor, writer and director

See also 
 

English toponymic surnames